André Jung may refer to:

 André Jung (actor) (born 1953), Luxembourgian theatre and film actor
 André Jung (musician) (born 1961), Brazilian drummer and journalist